Windy Peak, elevation , is a summit in the Kenosha Mountains of central Colorado. The peak is south of Bailey in the Lost Creek Wilderness. It is also home to Outdoor Lab for Jefferson County.

Historical names
Storm Mountain
Stormy Peak
Windy Peak – 1994

See also

List of Colorado mountain ranges
List of Colorado mountain summits
List of Colorado fourteeners
List of Colorado 4000 meter prominent summits
List of the most prominent summits of Colorado
List of Colorado county high points

References

External links

Mountains of Colorado
Mountains of Park County, Colorado
North American 3000 m summits